Batrachomoeus trispinosus, the three-spined frogfish or Broadbent's frogfish, is a species of Indo-Pacific toadfish, from the largely Old World subfamily, Halophryninae, of the family Batrachoididae. It is the type species of the genus Batrachomoeus. It is said to be the only fish known to cry like a baby and produce complex non-linear calls. Others fish can only make simple linear sounds but human babies and other mammals use non-linear sounds in their calls, in which other animals associate such non-linear sounds with a sense of emotional urgency.

It is distributed in the eastern Indian and western Pacific Oceans from Thailand to the Arafura Sea between northern Australia and New Guinea, it is found in the Mekong Delta. The alternative common name and the synonym Batrachomoeus broadbenti were coined by Ogilby in honour of the Australian explorer and collector of Australian and New Guinea specimens, Kendall Broadbent.

References

Batrachoididae
Fish described in 1861
Taxa named by Albert Günther